The Bimantara World Junior Championships was an international invitation badminton tournament for junior players. It was held in Jakarta, Indonesia from 1987 to 1991. Sponsor of the annually held event was the Indonesian Bimantara Group.

After the fifth edition of the Bimantara World Junior Championships, the event was replaced by the official World Junior Championships for badminton players under 19 years old by the International Badminton Federation.

Champions

References

External links 
BWF: World Junior Championships

Invitation Championships
Badminton tournaments in Indonesia